Episkopi, or Latinised forms Episcopia or Piscopia, may refer to the following places:

Cyprus
 Episkopi Bay, on the southeast coast
 Episkopi, Limassol, a village on Episkopi Bay
 Episkopi Cantonment, a British military base on Episkopi Bay
 Episkopi, Paphos, a village in the southwest interior
 Episcopia or Piscopia, former names for Bellapais Abbey in Northern Cyprus

Greece
 Episkopi, Heraklion, a town in Crete
 Episkopi, Lasithi, a town in Crete
 Episkopi, Rethymno, a town in Rethymno, Crete

Italy

See also 
 Cornaro Piscopia, a branch of the Venetian Cornaro family named after Episkopi, Limassol